Duncan B. Campbell is a scholar of Greek and Roman warfare. He published his first paper in 1984, as an undergraduate at the Glasgow University, Scotland, and produced a complete re-assessment of Roman siegecraft for his PhD. Besides academic articles, he has written several other popular books about ancient warfare, chiefly siegecraft, published by Osprey Publishing. He is a regular contributor to Ancient Warfare magazine and a frequent reviewer for Bryn Mawr Classical Review. He has published a new edition, with English translation, of the Roman military source known as the Liber de munitionibus castrorum, and a new edition, with English translation and detailed commentary, of the Ektaxis kat' Alanōn of Arrian.

References

External links
 Duncan B Campbell's website

 Author's page at Academia
 Author's page at Good Reads
 Meet the Author page at Karwansaray Publishers
 Author biography at Osprey Publishing
 Reviews at Bryn Mawr Classical Review

Living people
Year of birth missing (living people)
Alumni of the University of Glasgow